Ruff Creek is a large tributary to South Fork Tenmile Creek in southwestern Pennsylvania.  The stream rises in north-central Greene County and flows southeast entering South Fork Tenmile Creek northeast of Morrisville, Pennsylvania. The watershed is roughly 27% agricultural, 64% forested and the rest is other uses.

References

Rivers of Pennsylvania
Tributaries of the Monongahela River
Rivers of Greene County, Pennsylvania